There Was a Young Lady is a 1953 British comedy film directed by Lawrence Huntington and starring Michael Denison, Dulcie Gray and Sydney Tafler. It was made at Walton Studios and on location in London. The film's sets were designed by the art director Frederick Pusey. Huntington had been a prominent director in the 1940s but after this film he dropped into making second features. The film marked the screen debut of Geraldine McEwan as dim-witted secretary Irene.

Plot
Super-efficient secretary Elizabeth Foster effectively runs a diamond merchant firm. Her boss David Walsh (who inherited the firm from his uncle, but knows nothing about diamonds) buys a diamond ring from a street vendor, planning to propose to her, but she tells him the diamond is actually paste, and far from worth the £25 he paid. His embarrassment over this causes him to forgo proposing. She tells him of her plan to rescue the firm from its dire financial position, by purchasing the family jewels of a duke David went to school with for £70,000, though they only have to pay £7000 on account; she has a prospective buyer already, who may be willing to pay £90,000. However, David is unwilling to go along with how she intends to raise the sum (which includes mortgaging his willing mother's house), so she quits.

She walks out of her office and straight into the midst of a smash-and-grab robbery. Accidentally blocking the back door of the gang's getaway car, she is forced to get inside by Joe and driven away. She helps the three crooks evade the pursuing police car after being promised her release, but Johnny, their leader, reneges and she is taken to their hideout in rural Sussex, which is a mansion looked after by the uncle of Basher, another of the thieves. There she meets Arthur, the fourth member of the gang. She tips the farm worker who gives them a ride on his hay wagon to the mansion, but the message she wrote on the pound note is only noticed when he tries to spend it in the pub.

Elizabeth, a prisoner until the gang pull off another planned robbery in a few days, sets to improve their living conditions and also proves to know far more about their jewel haul than they do themselves. All her predictions as to how their future smash-and-grab plan will fail prove to be correct.

The gang, with the exception of Johnny, begin to look up to Elizabeth and treat her very well. She persuades the gang to follow a plan devised by Arthur. To her horror, they rob the wrong place, her former employer, and steal the jewellery David succeeded in buying from the duke. Worse still, displaying his usual ineptitude, Walsh neglected to have it insured. Nevertheless, after getting Elizabeth's message, he rescues her and the jewellery.

Several years later, they are happily married and prosperous, having purchased the mansion in which she was imprisoned, with the gang now employed as their servants.

Cast
 Michael Denison as David Walsh
 Dulcie Gray as Elizabeth Foster
 Sydney Tafler as Johnny
 Charles Farrell as Arthur
 Geraldine McEwan as Irene
 Marcel Poncin as 1st Jeweller
 Robert Adair as Basher
 Tommy Duggan as A.R. Weatherspoon, the pools man
 Bill Shine as Charlie, Duke of Chiddingford
 Bill Owen as Joe 
 Kenneth Connor as Tom Bass, the cart man
 Basil Dignam as 2nd Jeweller
 Ben Williams as Man delivering safe
 Janet Butler
 Gerald Rex
 The Tailormaids

Critical reception
Radio Times wrote "Chuckles abound"; and TV Guide noted "Decent comedy is slightly better than average, with Gray at her brightest."

References

Bibliography
 Chibnall, Steve & McFarlane, Brian. The British 'B' Film. Palgrave MacMillan, 2009.

External links

1953 films
British comedy films
1953 comedy films
British black-and-white films
Films directed by Lawrence Huntington
Films shot at Nettlefold Studios
Films produced by Ernest G. Roy
Films shot in London
Films set in London
Films set in Sussex
Butcher's Film Service films
1950s English-language films
1950s British films